Errigal Ringfort, also called Fort William, is a ringfort (rath) and National Monument located in County Cavan, Ireland.

Location

References

Archaeological sites in County Cavan
National Monuments in County Cavan